HMS Hydra was a reciprocating engine-powered  built for the Royal Navy during the Second World War. She was badly damaged during the war and was scrapped in 1947.

Design and description
The ships' complement consisted of 85 officers and ratings.

The reciprocating ships had two vertical triple-expansion steam engines, each driving one shaft, using steam provided by two Admiralty three-drum boilers.

The Algerine class was armed with a QF  Mk V anti-aircraft gun and four twin-gun mounts for Oerlikon 20 mm cannon. The latter guns were in short supply when the first ships were being completed and they often got a proportion of single mounts. By 1944, single-barrel Bofors 40 mm mounts began replacing the twin 20 mm mounts on a one for one basis. All of the ships were fitted for four throwers and two rails for depth charges.

Construction and career
Hydra was laid down at the yard of Lobnitz, Renfrew. As a result of savings raised during "Warship Week", she was adopted by Wellingborough Urban District Council in Northamptonshire on 14 March 1942. She was launched on 29 September 1942. Hydra joined the 18th Minesweeping Flotilla in the Rosyth Command on 20 February 1943 and was transferred in May 1943 to the Nore Command.  She was variously employed on minesweeping in the North Sea in 1943 and on escort duty with Arctic convoys from 1943-1944, including the convoys JW 55B and JW 57 to Kola in 1943-44.

She was part of Operation Neptune, the naval part of the D-Day landings at Normandy on 6 June 1944.  She was mined in the approaches to Ostend on 10 November 1944. She was towed to Sheerness but declared a constructive total loss and not repaired.  She was sold for scrap and arrived at the yard of Thos. W. Ward in Grays, Essex to be broken up in 1947.

References

Bibliography

External links
HMS Hydra at Uboat.net
memorial to the Algerine class in Portsmouth

Algerine-class minesweepers of the Royal Navy
Ships built on the River Clyde
1942 ships
World War II minesweepers of the United Kingdom
Maritime incidents in November 1944